Emanuel Lasker faced Siegbert Tarrasch in the 1908 World Chess Championship. It was played from August 17 to September 30, 1908 in Düsseldorf and Munich, Lasker successfully defending his title.

Results

The first player to win eight games would be the World Champion.

{| class="wikitable" style="text-align:center"
|+World Chess Championship Match 1908
|-
! !! 1 !! 2 !! 3 !! 4 !! 5 !! 6 !! 7 !! 8 !! 9 !! 10 !! 11 !! 12 !! 13 !! 14 !! 15 !! 16 !! Wins !! Total
|-
| align=left | 
| 1 ||style="background:black; color:white"| 1 || 0 ||style="background:black; color:white"| 1 || 1 ||style="background:black; color:white"| = || 1 ||style="background:black; color:white"| = || = ||style="background:black; color:white"| 0 || 1 ||style="background:black; color:white"| 0 || 1 || style="background:black; color:white"| = || = || style="background:black; color:white"| 1 || 8 || 10½ 
|-
| align=left | 
|style="background:black; color:white"| 0 || 0 ||style="background:black; color:white"| 1 || 0 ||style="background:black; color:white"| 0 || = ||style="background:black; color:white"| 0 || = ||style="background:black; color:white"| = || 1 || style="background:black; color:white"| 0 || 1 ||style="background:black; color:white"| 0 || = ||style="background:black; color:white"| = || 0 || 3 || 5½
|}

Lasker retained his title.

Game 14, which lasted for 119 moves, held the record for the longest game in a world championship until Game 5 of the 1978 championship, which lasted 124 moves.

References

External links
Source

1908
1908 in chess
1908 in Germany
Chess in Germany
Sport in Düsseldorf
Sports competitions in Munich